N,N-Dipropyltryptamine (DPT) is a psychedelic entheogen belonging to the tryptamine family. Use as a designer drug has been documented by law enforcement officials since as early as 1968. However, potential therapeutic use was not investigated until the 1970s.  It is found either as a crystalline hydrochloride salt or as an oily or crystalline base. It has not been found to occur endogenously. It is a close structural homologue of dimethyltryptamine and diethyltryptamine.

Frequent physical effects are nausea, numbness of the tongue or throat, and pupil dilation.

Pharmacology 

Studies on rodents have found that the effectiveness with which a selective 5-HT2A receptor antagonist blocks the behavioral actions of this compound strongly suggest that the 5-HT2A receptor is an important site of action for DPT, but the modulatory actions of a 5-HT1A receptor antagonist also imply a 5-HT1A-mediated component to the actions of DPT.

Chemistry 

DPT changes Ehrlich's reagent violet and causes the marquis reagent to turn yellow.

Psychedelic properties 

While dipropyltryptamine is chemically similar to [dimethyltryptamine-en] (DMT), its psychoactive effects are markedly different.

Side effects 
Negative side effects of human consumption of this drug can include increased heart rate, dizziness, anxiety, confusion, paranoia, seizure and nausea. The use of dipropyltryptamine has been implicated in at least one death as a result of seizures.

Religious use 

DPT is used as a religious sacrament by the Temple of the True Inner Light, a New York City offshoot of the Native American Church. The Temple believes DPT and other entheogens are physical manifestations of God.

Legal status

United Kingdom
DPT is a Class A drug in the United Kingdom, making it illegal to possess or distribute
.

United States
DPT is not scheduled at the federal level in the United States, but it could be considered an analog of 5-MeO-DiPT, DMT, or DET, in which case purchase, sale, or possession could be prosecuted under the Federal Analogue Act.

Florida
"DPT (N,N-Dipropyltryptamine)" is a Schedule I controlled substance in the state of Florida making it illegal to buy, sell, or possess in Florida.

Maine
DPT is a Schedule I controlled substance in the state of Maine making it illegal to buy, sell, or possess in Maine.

Sweden
DPT is illegal in Sweden as of 26 January 2016.

References

External links 
 TiHKAL entry
 DPT entry in TiHKAL • info
 A DPT Primer by Toad
 Erowid Experience Vault

Entheogens
Psychedelic tryptamines
Designer drugs
Serotonin receptor agonists